The NORCECA Boy's Youth Continental Championship U-19 is a volleyball competition for national teams, currently held biannually and organized by the NORCECA, the North America, Central America and Caribbean volleyball federation. The competition is played by men's under-19 teams.

History

Medal table

See also
Girls' Youth NORCECA Volleyball Championship

NORCECA Volleyball Championship
Men's NORCECA Volleyball Championship
V